The Nevada Northern Railway – McGill Depot in McGill, Nevada was listed on the National Register of Historic Places in 2015.

It is a one-and-one-half-story, Craftsman style railroad depot, built of concrete block walls on a poured concrete foundation. It was constructed by the Nevada Northern Railway.

It was deemed to have "significance as a primary component of the town’s social and economic life between 1910 and 1941."

A grant in 2004 was provided for the building's roof to be replaced for the Nevada Northern Railway Museum.

References

National Register of Historic Places in White Pine County, Nevada
Mission Revival architecture in Nevada
Railway stations in the United States opened in 1910
Railway stations on the National Register of Historic Places in Nevada
Railway stations closed in 1941
McGill Depot